Thomas Harrop Sidebottom (16 April 1826 – 25 May 1908) was a British businessman and Conservative Party politician.

He was the eldest son of William Sidebottom of Etherow House, Hollingworth, Cheshire. Following education at Manchester Grammar School, he followed his father into business as a cotton spinner and manufacturer in the city. He was a director of the Manchester, Sheffield and Lincolnshire Railway and was considered an authority on bimetallism.

Sidebottom was appointed a justice of the peace for the counties of Cheshire and Derbyshire and in 1886 married Edith Murgatroyd of Didsbury.

At the 1874 general election he was elected as Conservative Member of Parliament (MP) for Stalybridge. He was unseated by his Liberal opponent at the ensuing election in 1880, but regained the seat in 1885. He retired from parliament at the 1900 general election.

Death
Tom Harrop Sidebottom died at Etherow House in May 1908, aged 82.

References

Sources
Obituary, The Times, 26 May 1908, p. 13

External links
 

1826 births
1908 deaths
Conservative Party (UK) MPs for English constituencies
UK MPs 1874–1880
UK MPs 1885–1886
UK MPs 1886–1892
UK MPs 1892–1895
UK MPs 1895–1900